Gaudino is a surname. Notable people with the surname include:
Alex Gaudino (born 1970), Italian DJ
Gianluca Gaudino (born 1996), German footballer
James L. Gaudino, American academic administrator
Juan Gaudino (1893–1975), Argentine racecar driver
Luciano Gaudino (born 1958), Italian footballer
Maurizio Gaudino (born 1966), German footballer
Robert Gaudino (1925–1974), American educator